The 1989 New Mexico Lobos football team was an American football team that represented the University of New Mexico in the Western Athletic Conference (WAC) during the 1989 NCAA Division I-A football season.  In their third season under head coach Mike Sheppard, the Lobos compiled a 2–10 record (0–7 against WAC opponents) and were outscored by a total of 378 to 298. 

The team's statistical leaders included Jeremy Leach with 3,573 passing yards, Dion Morrow with 664 rushing yards, and Terance Mathis with 1,315 receiving yards and 96 points scored.

Schedule

References

New Mexico
New Mexico Lobos football seasons
New Mexico Lobos football